Yasaqi (also Romanized as Yasāqī) is a village in Dughayi Rural District, in the Central District of Quchan County, Razavi Khorasan Province, Iran. At the 2006 census, its population was 334, in 94 families.

References 

Populated places in Quchan County